Michael Anthony Johnson (born 11 August 1988) is an Australian cricketer who played for Western Australia and Worcestershire County Cricket Club.

External links
 

1988 births
Living people
Western Australia cricketers
Australian cricketers
Cricketers from Perth, Western Australia
Worcestershire cricketers
Sportsmen from Western Australia